Preston is a surname, and may refer to:

Alan Preston (1932–2004), New Zealand soccer player
Alex Preston (born 1979), British writer
Alice Bolam Preston (1888–1958), American illustrator
Allan Preston (born 1969), Scottish footballer
Amber Preston, stand-up comedian
Andrej Preston, Slovenian internet personality
Andrew Preston (disambiguation), multiple people
Ann Preston (1813–1872), American doctor and educator
Ann Preston (1910–2002), American actress better known as Shaindel Kalish
Anthony Preston (disambiguation), multiple people
Antony Preston (1938–2004), English naval historian
Arthur Preston (disambiguation), multiple people
Ashlee Marie Preston, American media personality, producer, and activist
Benjamin Preston (1846–1914), English cricketer
Billy Preston (1946–2006), American musician
Bob Preston, Scottish footballer
Brian Preston (born 1958), Australian judge
Carl Preston (born 1991), English footballer
Carrie Preston (born 1967), American actress
Chanel Preston (born 1985), American pornographic actress
Sir Charles Preston, 5th Baronet (c. 1735–1800), British Army officer
Charles M. Preston (1848–1909), American lawyer and banker
Cheryl Preston, American law professor
Christopher Preston, 2nd Baron Gormanston (c. 1354 – 1422), Anglo-Irish peer and statesman
Cynthia Preston (born 1968), Canadian actress
Dan Preston (born 1991), English footballer
Dave Preston (disambiguation), multiple people
Denis Preston (1916–1979), British record producer and music critic
Don Preston (born 1932), American musician
Don Preston (guitarist), American musician
Douglas Preston (born 1956), American author
Douglas A. Preston (1858–1929), American lawyer and politician
Duke Preston (born 1982), American football player
Duncan Preston (born 1946), British actor
Eddie Preston (1925–2009), American musician
Edward Preston (1831–1890), lawyer and judge in Hawaii
Edward Carter Preston (1885–1965), English artist
Edwina Preston, Australian musician and author
Francis Preston (1765–1836), American lawyer and politician
Frank W. Preston (1896–1989), American ecologist, engineer, and conservationist
Gaylene Preston (born 1947), New Zealand film director
Gerry Preston, New Zealand boxing trainer
Gordon Preston (1925–2015), English mathematician
Harry Preston (disambiguation), multiple people
Hayter Preston (1891–1964), British journalist
Henry Preston (disambiguation), multiple people
Herbert Irving Preston (1876–1928), American Medal of Honor recipient
Hubert Preston (1868–1960), British journalist
J. A. Preston, American actor
Jacob Alexander Preston (1796–1868), American politician
James Preston (disambiguation), multiple people
Jean R. Preston, American politician
Jenico Preston, 14th Viscount Gormanston (1837–1907)
Nicholas Preston, 17th Viscount Gormanston (born 1939)
Jimmy Preston (1913–1984), American musician
John Preston (disambiguation), multiple people
Johnny Preston (1939–2011), American singer
Joseph Preston (disambiguation), multiple people
Josiah Preston (1885–unknown), English footballer
Josiah Johnston Preston (1855–1937), Canadian businessman and politician
June Preston (born 1928), American actress and singer
Karen Preston (born 1971), Canadian figure skater
Keith Preston (1884–1927), American journalist
Kelly Preston (1962–2020), American actress
Kenneth Preston (born 1957), American soldier
Kiki Preston (1898–1946), American socialite
Lewis Preston (disambiguation), multiple people
Lionel Preston (1875–1971), Royal Navy officer
Luke Preston (born 1976), Welsh judoka
Margaret Preston (1875–1963), Australian artist
Margaret Junkin Preston (1820–1897), American poet and author
Mark Preston (disambiguation), multiple people
Matt Preston (born 1961), Australian journalist
Maurice A. Preston (1912–1983), United States Air Force general
Michael Preston (disambiguation), multiple people
Natalie Preston (born 1977), English footballer
Nigel Preston (1959–1992), British musician
Noel Preston, ethicist, theologian and social commentator
Norman Preston (1903–1980), English cricket journalist
Paschal Preston, Irish academic
Paul Preston (born 1946), British historian
Peter Preston (1938–2018), British journalist
Peter Preston (politician) (born 1935), Canadian politician
Platt A. Preston (1837–1900), American politician
Prince Hulon Preston, Jr. (1908–1961), American politician, educator and lawyer
Rachel Oakes Preston (1809–1868),  member of Seventh-day Adventist Church
Ray Preston (disambiguation), multiple people
Reg Preston (1917–2000), Australian potter
Rich Preston (born 1952), Canadian ice hockey player
Richard Preston (born 1954), American author
Richard Preston (clergyman) (1791–1861), American religious leader
Richard Franklin Preston (1860–1929), Canadian physician and politician
Rob Preston (born 1982), American basketball player
Robert Preston (disambiguation), multiple people
Roell Preston (born 1972), American football player
Ron Preston (born 1958), American speedway rider
Sally Preston (born 1964), British entrepreneur
Samuel Preston (disambiguation), multiple people including:
Sarah Preston (born 1970), English actress
Shelley Preston (born 1964), English singer
Simon Preston (born 1938), British organist and composer
Stephen Preston (disambiguation), multiple people
Steve Preston (born 1960), American businessman and civil servant
Thomas Preston (disambiguation), multiple people
Tommy Preston, Scottish footballer
Walt Preston (1868–1937), American baseball player
Walter Preston (disambiguation), multiple people
Ward Preston, American production designer and art director
Wayde Preston (1929–1992), American actor
William Preston (disambiguation), multiple people
Yves Preston (born 1956), Canadian ice hockey player

See also
List of people with given name Preston

Preston
Preston
Preston